Franz Herterich (3 October 1877 – 28 October 1966) was a German actor. He was born in Munich and died in Vienna.

Partial filmography
 The Eye of the Buddha (1919)
 Der Traum im Walde (1919) - alter Diener
 Todestreue (1919)
 The Prince and the Pauper (1920) - John Canty
 Dr. Hallin (1921) - Dr. Ernest Hallin
 Die Schauspielerin des Kaisers (1921) 
 Samson and Delilah (1922) - Prince Andrei Andrewiwitch / Abimelech, Philistine King (double role)
 The Ragpicker of Paris (1922)
 Sodom und Gomorrha (1922)
 Children of the Revolution (1923)
 Das Gift der Borgia (1924)
 Der Musikant von Eisenstadt (1934) - Kaiser Franz
 So Ended a Great Love (1934)
 Liebesträume (1935) - Franz Liszt
 Court Theatre (1936) - Director of the Burgtheaters
 Romance (1936)
 The Fire Devil (1940) - Emperor Francis I 
  (1941) - Great Prince
 Whom the Gods Love (1942)
 Aufruhr der Herzen (1944) - Raimund Brugger
 Kolberg (1945) - King Francis II
 Archduke Johann's Great Love (1950) - Kaiser Franz I
 Asphalt (1951) 
 Maria Theresa (1951) - Nuncio
 1. April 2000 (1952) - Amerik. Hochkommissar
 Franz Schubert (1953) - (uncredited) (final film role)

Bibliography
 Kulik, Karol. Alexander Korda: The Man Who Could Work Miracles. Virgin Books, 1990.

External links

1877 births
1966 deaths
German male film actors
German male silent film actors
Male actors from Munich
20th-century German male actors